Devi Parikh is an American computer scientist.

Career 
Parikh earned her PhD in Electrical and Computer Engineering at Carnegie Mellon University. She has served as a professor at Virginia Tech and Georgia Tech, and as of 2022 she is a research director at Meta.

Research 
Parikh's research focuses on computer vision and natural language processing.

In 2015, Parikh and her students at Virginia Tech worked on AI for Visual Question Answering (VQA). This technology allows users to ask questions about pictures, e.g. "Is this a vegetarian pizza?" Parikh's VQA dataset has been used to evaluate over 30 AI models.

In 2017, Parikh published a conversational agent called ParlAI. In 2020, she developed an AI system that generates dance moves in sync with songs. In 2022, Parikh and a team at Meta developed Make-a-Video, a text-to-video AI model that is based on the diffusion algorithm.

References 

American computer scientists
Living people
Artificial intelligence researchers
Machine learning researchers
Computer vision researchers
Georgia Tech faculty
Year of birth missing (living people)